Andrej Krementschouk (Andrei Krementschuk; born 2 May 1973 in Gorki, Soviet Union) is a photographer who is based in Leipzig. His first book, No Direction Home, received several awards and international attention.

Works 
 2008–2011 Zone Chernobyl
 2005–2007 No Direction Home
 2006–2010 Come Bury Me

Bibliography

Books by Krementschouk
 No Direction Home. Heidelberg: Kehrer, 2009. . With text by Krementschouk and Boris Mikhailov. 
 Come Bury Me. Heidelberg: Kehrer, 2010. . 
 Chernobyl Zone I, Kehrer, 2011. 
 Chernobyl Zone II, Author: Wolfgang Kil, Esther Ruelfs, Andrej Krementschouk, Kehrer Verlag, 2011.

Books with contributions by Krementschouk
 Die Stadt. Vom Werden und Vergehen / The City. Becoming and Decaying. Ostfildern: Hatje Cantz Verlag, 2010. .

Exhibitions

Solo exhibitions
 2009 — "No Direction Home", Filipp Rosbach Galerie (Leipzig); Galerie Clara Maria Sels (Düsseldorf)
 2009 — "Krementschouk Andrej, Photographie", Kunstverein Recklinghausen (Recklinghausen)
 2011 — »Heimat – Chernobyl«, Galerie Clara Maria Sels (Düsseldorf)
 2011 — »Zone Heimat. Chernobyl«, Reiss-Engelhorn-Museen, ZEPHYR – Raum für Fotografie / C4.9b, (Mannheim)
 2011 — »No Direction Home«, in Studio im Hochhaus – Kunst und Literaturwerkstatt, Berlin
 2011 — «No Direction Home», Blue Sky, the Oregon Center for the Photographic Arts, Portland USA

Group exhibitions

 2008 — "Friction and Conflict", Kalmar Konstmuseum (Kalmar)
 2008 — "Russische Variationen", Painting and Photography. Drostei, Pinneberg bei Hamburg
 2008 — "Good prospects: Young German photography 2007—2008", Martin-Gropius-Bau (Berlin); Deichtorhallen (Hamburg)
 2010 — "The City. Becoming and Decaying", C/O Berlin, International Forum For Visual Dialogues, Berlin; Bayrischen Versicherungskammer (Munich)
 2010 – FotoDoks 2010 – Documentary Photofestival, Munich
 2010 – F/STOP 4. Internationales Fotografiefestival, Leipzig
 2011 — "The City. Becoming and Decaying", Lindenau-Museum, Altenburg
 2011 — "The Street of Enthusiasts", exhibition by Heinrich-Böll-Stiftung and Morat Institute, Berlin, Kiew, Warschau, Gartow, Freiburg, Hamburg, Brussel

Awards / Grants 
 2010 PDN Photo Annual 2010 — «No Direction Home»
 2009 Deutscher Fotobuchpreis 2010 silver prize winner, No Direction Home
 2007–2008 No Direction Home at "Gute Aussichten – junge deutsche Fotografie" ("Good prospects: Young German photography") 2007–2008

References

External links
 Dana Jennings, Pastorals of the Atomic Age
 Joerg Colberg, review of Chernobyl Zone (I)
 Joerg Colberg, review of No Direction Home
 Douglas Stockdale, review of No Direction Home 

Photographers from Leipzig
Russian photographers
Artists from Nizhny Novgorod
Russian expatriates in Germany
Living people
1973 births